Subulitoidea is an extinct superfamily of fossil sea snails, marine gastropod mollusks in the clade Caenogastropoda.

References